Football Lovers' Day is observed in memorial to be the most tragic day in Indian football history, when 16 football fans died due to a stampede and riot inside the Eden Gardens stadium in Kolkata on 16 August 1980 on the occasion of a Kolkata Derby match in the Calcutta Football League.

Events leading up to the disaster
The Kolkata Derby has been an eternal rivalry between the two oldest clubs in Indian football—Mohun Bagan and East Bengal—and has been featured on the list of FIFA's Classic Rivalries. The fanaticism around football in Kolkata in the 1970s was unparalleled and the Bangal-Ghoti rivalry was the pinnacle of football rivalries in Asia, as football became an escape from the political turmoil of the 70s in Kolkata.

East Bengal had the better of their arch-rivals in the better part of the previous decade by winning almost all trophies between 1970-1975. Mohun Bagan were fast growing back into their old stature, winning the Triple Crown in 1978. Just a few months back, the two teams had a bitter clash in the 1980 Federation Cup final, which ended 1-1; both were declared joint winners. Both sets of fans were eager to get the bragging rights and the tempers were already high before the kick-off in the ill-fated Kolkata Derby.

Mohun Bagan was led by Compton Dutta while the East Bengal team was led by Satyajit Mitra. The match began in high intensity as Dilip Palit, who started in an un-orthodox right back position for the Red and Golds and committed a rash foul on Bidesh Bose, who was full of trickery on the left flank, in the 11th minute of the game. The referee, Sudhin Chatterjee, didn't produce a card for Dilip Palit, which was a shock for all. After the break, a similar incident happened in the 57th minute and Bidesh Ranjan Bose retaliated, which led the referee to give marching orders to the Mohun Bagan left winger while Dilip Palit was again left unpunished. The referee committed another blunder when he gave Dilip Palit marching orders a few moments later as an act of balancing his previous decision. This started a riot in the stadium among both sets of fans.

Confrontation
Usually, the East Bengal and Mohun Bagan fans are seated in separate galleries so that any kind of fan riots are prevented. However, on that day, both sets of fans were made to sit together in the stands. In the absence of segregation and inadequate police protection in the stands, the riots spread like wildfire and people started running towards exits to save themselves. Young fans jumped off the high stands onto concrete floors to save themselves while many tried to flee through the narrow gates, which led many to fall down. It caused an inevitable stampede that took the lives of 16 football fans.

The match
The players and the officials did not have any idea of what was happening in the stands. The game was stopped for few moments after the double red cards and the game went on where both teams played with 10 men and the game finished at 0-0.

Match Details

Aftermath of the disaster
The bodies of the injured were taken over to the nearby hospitals and people flocked over at the various locations to identify their missing kin. The police report claimed that 16 fans were dead and many were left injured. All the matches for the rest of the season were cancelled and both the teams were heavily fined.

Impact on people
This tragedy sent the entire sports fraternity and the Bengali community into shock and people who were regulars to the Kolkata Maidan suddenly disappeared on the aftermath of the disaster. The football-crazy Bengali was nowhere to be seen, as they faced stiff resistance from their families to attend the next set of matches. People who went to the matches every week now either snapped their ties from the Kolkata Maidan or attended the games with fear in their minds. The fanaticism in Kolkata regarding the Beautiful Game was gone and took nearly two decades to recover, until when the Salt Lake Stadium saw a record-breaking attendance of 131,000 in the 1997 Federation Cup.

Commemorations
The Indian Football Association observes Football Lovers' Day as a memorial to the 16 Football Fans who died on 16 August 1980. The first memorial, held in 1981, saw a total number of 1203 people donating blood. 

The IFA and other District Associations observe the Football Lovers' Day every year on 16 August and the players who were part of the ill-fated match are present at the event and hand over signed certificates to the blood donors.

The legendary singer Manna Dey sang a song, Khela football khela, composed by Suparnakanti Ghosh, to pay homage to those unfortunate souls who lost their lives on that ill-fated day.

The 16 fans
The names of the 16 football lovers who died on that day:
 Kartik Maity
 Uttam Chowle
 Samir Das
 Aloke Das
 Sanat Basu
 Nabin Nashkar
 Kalyan Samanta
 Ashim Chatterjee
 Robin Adak
 Kartik Maji
 Dhananjoy Das
 Shyamal Biswas
 Madam Mohan Bagli
 Prashanta Dutta
 Himangshu Sekhar Das
 Bishwajit Kar

References

https://www.fifalove.com/
https://www.fifalove.com/

External links
 IFA official site
FIFALove

East Bengal Club
Human stampedes in India
Human stampedes in 1980
Disasters in sports venues
Stadium disasters
Disasters in West Bengal